CCGS Tuebor was a specialty vessel of the Canadian Coast Guard used for environmental responses in the Maritimes and formerly a fisheries patrol vessel. The vessel was listed for auction in November 2018 as a "1987 Les Bateau 12M Marine Vessel..." for $30,000.00 Canadian. At time of sale she had undergone refit less than 200 hours of use prior, and was equipped with a Volvo Penta Inboard Diesel, model TAMD 103A. She was registered to Ottawa, under 808729.

References

External links

Tuebor
1985 ships
Ships built in Nova Scotia
Ships of the Canadian Coast Guard